The Phoenician Ship Expedition is a re-creation of a 6th-century BCE Phoenician voyage conceived by Philip Beale. The replica of an ancient Phoenician ship departed from  Syria in August 2008, to sail through the Suez Canal, around the Horn of Africa, and  up the west coast of Africa, through the Strait of Gibraltar and across the Mediterranean to return to Syria. 
The objective of the expedition was to prove that ships built by the ancient Phoenicians could withstand the conditions around the African coastline.

The expedition reached South Africa in January 2010 and Beirut in October of the same year.

The ship is twenty metres long and was constructed at Arwad Island, the site of an ancient Phoenician city-state just off the Syrian coast, by Syrian shipwright Khalid Hammoud, using traditional methods.

Phoenicians Before Columbus expedition
A second sea voyage has also been completed. On 31 December 2019, the Phoenicia docked in the port of Santo Domingo, Dominican Republic. For this final voyage, Beale set out to demonstrate that the Phoenicians could have crossed the Atlantic Ocean long before Christopher Columbus.
The journey was launched on 28 September 2019 in the commune of Carthage, Tunisia, site of the ancient city of Carthage, and reached Santo Domingo before 31 December 2019.

Purchase by Latter Day Saints
The ship has been purchased by members of the Latter Day Saint movement, with the intent of restoring it and setting up a visitor's center in Iowa, US. Their website says, "we will unveil the magnificence of a historic ship that goes back 2,600 years from the time when Mulek and his people traveled from Jerusalem to the Heartland of America."

References

External links
Official website

Replications of ancient voyages
African expeditions
Transport in Phoenicia
Latter Day Saint movement